The men's 50-metre freestyle event was the 28th event contested of the swimming events at the 2007 World Aquatics Championships at the Rod Laver Arena, Melbourne, Australia. The heats were held in the morning session of the meet on 30 March 2007, with the semi-finals in the evening session of the same day. The final was held on the evening of 31 March 2007.

Records
Prior to the championships, the following world and World Championship records were listed by FINA.

Heats

Semi-finals

Final

References

Swimming at the 2007 World Aquatics Championships